The Legend of Jake Kincaid is an independent Western film directed by Alan Autry, and released in 2002. The movie is currently available for streaming on Netflix under the title, Forgiven.

The year is 1878 and Jake Kincaid is a man just out of prison, full of hate and hard on the trail of the men responsible for the crime for which he was wrongly imprisoned. Kincaid is bent on revenge and it seems that nothing can stand between him and the gold he was accused of stealing. That is until he finds himself in the small lumber town of Fairplay, California where he learns that love is more powerful than hate and redemption more valuable than gold.

Starring Alan Autry and David Hart from the long running CBS television hit In the Heat of the Night. Jake Kincaid is Autry's directorial debut.

Cast
Alan Autry as Jake Kincaid
David Hart as Sheriff Bob Logan
Kimberlee Autry as Emma
James W. Tuck as Luthor Hanks
Ray Appleton as Josh Quinn

Filmed at Old Town near North Fork, California.

References

External links
 Official site
 Jake Kincaid
 

2002 television films
2002 films
2002 Western (genre) films
Films shot in California